James Beaumont "Beau" Bell (born May 26, 1986) is a former American football linebacker. He was drafted by the Cleveland Browns in the fourth round of the 2008 NFL Draft. He played college football at UNLV. Bell was also a member of the Omaha Nighthawks, Las Vegas Locomotives, Spokane Shock, BC Lions, Los Angeles Kiss and Philadelphia Soul.

Early years
Bell played high school football at Tustin High School in Tustin, California.

College career
Bell played inside linebacker at UNLV. Bell was the 2007 Mountain West Conference Defensive MVP. He played 41 games at UNLV and started 26. He was named league player of the week four times, tying the school record set by former Rebel Randall Cunningham.

Professional career

Cleveland Browns
Bell was drafted by the Cleveland Browns in the fourth round (104th overall) of the 2008 NFL Draft. He was waived on September 5, 2009

Omaha Nighthawks
Bell signed with the Omaha Nighthawks of the United Football League on August 12, 2010.

BC Lions
On May 17, 2012, Bell was signed by the BC Lions of the Canadian Football League.

Philadelphia Soul
On February 20, 2015, Bell was traded to the Philadelphia Soul in exchange for Derrick Ross. On January 28, 2016, Bell was assigned to the Soul for the 2016 season. On August 26, 2016, the Soul beat the Arizona Rattlers in ArenaBowl XXIX by a score of 56–42. He earned First-team All-Arena honors in 2017. On August 26, 2017, the Soul beat the Tampa Bay Storm in ArenaBowl XXX by a score of 44–40.

Post-playing career
In March 2018, it was announced that Bell had joined the Albany Empire as the team's Director of Player Personnel and Pass Rush Coordinator.
In 2019, Bell returned to the Philadelphia Soul and was Promoted to General Manager / Assistant Head Coach.

References

External links

UNLV Rebels bio

1986 births
Living people
People from Tustin, California
Players of American football from California
Sportspeople from Orange County, California
American football linebackers
UNLV Rebels football players
Cleveland Browns players
Omaha Nighthawks players
Spokane Shock players
Las Vegas Locomotives players
Los Angeles Kiss players
Philadelphia Soul players
Albany Empire (AFL) coaches